Law and Critique (print: ,) is a triannual law journal closely involved with the critical legal studies community. It was established in 1990 and is associated with the Critical Legal Conference. Law and Critique takes a critical perspective on all aspects of legal theory, jurisprudence, and substantive law and covers the influences of a variety of schools of thought into legal scholarship (such as postmodernism, feminism, queer theory, critical race theory, literary approaches to law, psychoanalysis, law and the humanities, law and aesthetics, and post-colonialism).

It is not affiliated with any law school.

External links 
 
Online access

Critical legal studies
International law journals
Triannual journals
Springer Science+Business Media academic journals
English-language journals
Publications established in 1990